Blues All Around My Head is an album by blues musicians Brownie McGhee and Sonny Terry recorded in 1960 and released on the Bluesville label the following year.

Track listing
All compositions by Brownie McGhee except where noted.
 "Blues All Around My Head" (Sonny Terry) – 4:27
 "East Coast Blues" – 3:31
 "Muddy Water" (Traditional) – 4:14
 "Beggin' and Cryin'" – 3:04
 "My Plan" – 3:56
 "Trying to Deceive Me" – 3:49
 "Everything I Had Is Gone" – 4:15
 "Jealous Man" – 3:26
 "Understand Me" – 3:54
 "Blues of Happiness" – 2:36

Personnel

Performance
Sonny Terry – harmonica, vocals
Brownie McGhee – guitar, vocals

Production
 Rudy Van Gelder – engineer

References

Brownie McGhee albums
Sonny Terry albums
1961 albums
Bluesville Records albums
Albums recorded at Van Gelder Studio